Oguzhan Engineering and Technology University of Turkmenistan is a university located in Ashgabat, Turkmenistan. It was established in 2016.

History 
Oguzhan Engineering and Technology University of Turkmenistan was established as a joint Turkmen–Japanese project in science and education. It is the 19th civilian higher education institution in Turkmenistan. It partially uses premises of the former International Turkmen-Turkish University in the Köşi neighborhood of Ashgabat, and is located on Taslama köçesi.

Faculties 
Chemistry and Nanotechnology
Biotechnology and Ecology
Computer Sciences and Information Technology
Automatics and Electronics
Economics of Innovations

Majors 

 Materials science and technology of new materials
 Nanomaterials
 Chemical technology
 Chemical engineering
 Biotechnology
 Ecology and nature management
 Genetics and bioengineering
 Cell and molecular biology
 Microbiology
 Information systems and technology
 Informatics and computer engineering
 Mobile and network engineering
 Animation and graphic design
 Digital infrastructure and cybersecurity
 Digital economy
 Applied mathematics and informatics
 Automation and control
 Electronics and nanoelectronics
 Mechatronics and robotics
 Biomedical electronics
 Physics for modern technology
 Innovatics
 Innovation economics
 Human resource management
 Technology entrepreneurship
 Philology (technical English and Japanese)

Clubs and Activities 

 Bionics
 Biotech

Campus 

There are eight buildings in the campus.

1. Main building (Rectorate, Department of Biotechnology, Ecology and Nature Management, Biomedicine Electronics, Automation and Control, Electronics and Nanoelectronics, Robotics and Mechatronics)
2. Chemistry and Nanotechnology (Department of Materials Science, Nanomaterials, Chemical Technology, Information Systems and Technologies, Computer Science)
3. Innovative Economy (Department of Innovation Sciences, Language prep students)
4. Science and Research Center
5. Health and Sport Center
6. Library and Dining hall
7. Dormitory-1
8. Dormitory-2

Additionally there are football, tennis, open and closed basketball, and volleyball courts.

Transportation to Campus 

Bus lines coming to university bus station

line 28 From 1st Carfactory- to Gurtly, via Magtymguly ave and Görogly str. (line close to train station)
Line 29 From PARAHAT 7 - to Gurtly, through PARAHAT 1,2,3,4, Turkmenbaşy str, Magtymguly str (line close to train station)
Line 42 From Cardiology center - to Gurtly, through Çandybil, Bitaraplyk, Atamyrat Nyýazow and Görogly str. 
Line 56 From Alem Çenter- to Gurtly, through Arçabil, Sowetsky, Atamyrat Nyýazow and Görogly str.
Line 40 From PARAHAT 7 - to Gurtly, through Oguzhan str, Nurmuhammet Andalip (Mir str) and Görogly str.
Line 73 From PARAHAT 7- To Gurtly, Through Oguzhan str. Bekrewe str and Görogly str.
Line 13 From PARAHAT 7 - to Gurtly, Through Oguzhan str, Atamyrat Nyýazow str, Görogly str.
Line 23 From PARAHAT 7 - to Gurtly, Oguzhan str, Nurmuhammet Andalip str, and Magtymguly str.
Line 52 From International Airport - to Gurtly

The university is close to Oguzhan köçesi, allowing use of many bus lines including 10, 63, and 50, which use that street.

References 

Universities in Turkmenistan
Buildings and structures in Ashgabat
Educational institutions established in 2016
Education in Ashgabat
2016 establishments in Turkmenistan